Amalia  is a 1936  Argentine film directed and script written by Luis Moglia Barth. It was based on the novel by José Mármol and is also a remake of the 1914 film Amalia of the same name. The film starred Herminia Franco.

Cast
Herminia Franco as Amalia
Floren Delbene
Miguel Gómez Bao

See also
Amalia (1914 film)

References

External links

1936 films
1930s Spanish-language films
Argentine black-and-white films
Films directed by Luis Moglia Barth
Works about the Argentine Civil War
Argentine war drama films
1930s war drama films